Hog Wild is a 1980 Canadian comedy film directed by Les Rose and written by Andrew Peter Marin. The film stars Patti D'Arbanville, Michael Biehn, Tony Rosato, Angelo Rizacos, Martin Doyle and Claude Philippe. The film was released on June 1, 1980, by Embassy Pictures.

Plot
A Canadian (Michael Biehn) defends his old campus against an outlaw biker (Tony Rosato) and his motorcycle gang.

Cast      
 Patti D'Arbanville as Angie Barnes
 Michael Biehn as Tim Warner
 Tony Rosato as "Bull"
 Angelo Rizacos as "Bean"
 Martin Doyle as "Shadow"
 Claude Philippe as "Indian"
 Matt Craven as "Chrome"
 Jack Blum as Gil Lasky
 Keith Knight as Vern Jones
 Michael Zelniker as Pete Crenshaw
 Robin McCulloch as "Stiff" Curd
 Sean McCann as Colonel Warner
 John Rutter as Sheriff Earl Ramble
 Bronwen Mantel as Mrs. Ramble
 Karen Stephen as Brenda Dillard
 Stephanie Miller as Sarah Milliken
 Mitch Martin as Polly
 Jacoba Knaapen as Tina
 Thomas Kovacs as "Veel"
 Matt Birman as Lead
 Susan Harrop as Jenny
 Norman Taviss as Henry Curd
 Bena Singer as Mrs. Milliken
 Len Watt as Mr. Dillard
 Roland Nincheri as Mr. Crenshaw

References

External links
 
 

1980 films
English-language Canadian films
Canadian comedy films
1980 comedy films
Embassy Pictures films
Films directed by Les Rose
1980s English-language films
1980s Canadian films